Paola Minaccioni (born 25 September 1971) is an Italian actress.

Her credits include Fasten Your Seatbelts, Many Kisses Later, Magnificent Presence and the television series Una pallottola nel cuore. She won the 2012 Globo d'Oro for her supporting role in Magnificent Presence and the Nastro d'Argento for Best Supporting Actress for Fasten Your Seatbelts in 2014.

Selected filmography
Women Don't Want To (1993)
Instructing the Heart (2003)
Cuore Sacro (2005)
Fascisti su Marte (2006)
Notte prima degli esami – Oggi (2007)
Concrete Romance (2007)
Un'estate al mare (2008)
Many Kisses Later (2009)
Loose Cannons (2010)
Baciato dalla fortuna (2011)
Wedding in Paris (2011)
Viva l'Italia (2012)
Magnificent Presence (2012)
Reality (2012)
Pazze di me (2013)
Fasten Your Seatbelts (2014)
A Fairy-Tale Wedding (2014)
Happily Mixed Up (2014)
Un Natale stupefacente (2014)
Burning Love (2015)
Torno indietro e cambio vita (2015)
Miami Beach (2016)
Blessed Madness (2018)
Natale a cinque stelle (2018)
Don't Stop Me Now (2019)
Lockdown all'italiana (2020)
In vacanza su Marte (2020)
The Ignorant Angels – TV series (2022)
Io e Spotty (2022)

References

External links
 

1971 births
Italian film actresses
Actresses from Rome
Living people